Juan Manuel Burgos Velasco (born 1961, Valladolid) is a Spanish Personalist philosopher. He holds a PhD in physics, (Barcelona, 1988) and a PhD in philosophy (Rome, 1992). He is professor at the University San Pablo CEU, Madrid and at the John Paul II Institute, Madrid, a member of the Jacques Maritain International Institute, and distinguished guest professor at Galileo University (2007, Guatemala). In 2007, he became an honorary professor at the Institute of Family Sciences (Guatemala) for his contribution to family sciences through his anthropology studies.

He is founder and actual president of Spain's Asociación Española de Personalismo, an institution dedicated to develop and promote personalism through publications and seminaries. The editor of Palabra Editorials, Madrid, Burgos has published books and articles on specialized magazines on diverse topics on Personalism, philosophical anthropology, bioethics, and sociology of the family.

Published works
 La inteligencia ética. La propuesta de Jacques Maritain, 1995, .
 El personalismo. Autores y temas de una filosofía nueva, 2000, (2ª ed. 2003) .
 Antropología: una guía para la existencia, 2003 (2ª ed. 2005), .
 Diagnóstico sobre la familia, 2004, .
 Para comprender a Jacques Maritain. Un ensayo histórico-crítico, 2006, .
 Hacia una definición de la filosofía personalista, (editor, en colaboración con José Luis Cañas y Urbano Ferrer), 2006, .
 La filosofía personalista de Karol Wojtyła, (editor), 2007, .
 Repensar la naturaleza humana, 2007, .
 El vuelo del alción, (editor en colaboración con José Luis Cañas), 2009, .

References
 AN ADEQUATE CONCEPT OF "HUMAN NATURE" IS KEY AGAINST RELATIVISTIC DRIFT, Zenit.org. Accessed 12 November 2022.
 Profile: Juan Manuel Burgos, personalismo.org. Accessed 12 November 2022.

External links
 Asociación Española de Personalismo
 Juan Manuel Burgos : Repensar la naturaleza humana
 Juan Manuel Burgos Velasco, artículos de revistas, en Dialnet
 Burgos Velasco, Juan Manuel (2007) Karol Wojtyła, Philosofica. [8-6-2008]
 Cañas, José Luis (2001), ¿Renacimiento del personalismo?, Anales del seminario de historia de la filosofía  (2001), ISSN 0211-2337, n.º 18, pp. 151–176
 DOI.org  J. M. Burgos, The method of Karol Wojtyła: a way between phenomenology, personalism and methaphysics, en A-T. Tymieniecka (Ed.) Phenomenology and Existentialism in the Twentieth Century. Book II. Serie “Analecta husserliana” vol. 104 (2010), 107–129.  

Spanish philosophers
1961 births
Living people